Seaming may refer to:

Seam types
Seaming (metalworking), a metalworking process that creates a seam along an edge of sheet metal